Daniel Scholl Observatory  was the astronomical observatory built by Franklin and Marshall College in Lancaster, Pennsylvania.  Construction began in 1884 and the building was dedicated June 16, 1886.  Total cost of the observatory and equipment was $13,579.

 Building cost- $3,000
 Steel Dome $2,000 by Grubb & Sons, Dublin, Ireland
 Equipment cost-$8,579 total 
 $4,199 for 11" Repsold Telescope (Hamburg, Germany) 
 $2,200 lens manufactured by Alvan Clark & Sons, Cambridge, Massachusetts
 $2,180 for chronometer, chronograph, transit, clock and other equipment

Starting in 1889 it was one of the official Pennsylvania weather stations.  In 1925 the observatory was moved 200 yards north to make way for a dormitory.  The observatory was razed in 1966.

Directors 
 Jefferson E. Kershner

Telescopes 

The observatory contained an 11-inch Clark-Repsold refracting telescope.

See also 

List of astronomical observatories

References

External links
Franklin & Marshall Building Webpage 

Astronomical observatories in Pennsylvania
Defunct astronomical observatories
Demolished buildings and structures in Pennsylvania
Buildings and structures demolished in 1966